The Japanese conservative Kibō no Tō (the Party of Hope) held a leadership election on 10 November 2017. It was the party's first leadership election since its formation in September 2017, prior to the 2017 general election. The race was held to choose a co-leader to serve alongside party leader and founder Yuriko Koike.

Representative Yuichiro Tamaki beat fellow Kibō lawmaker Hiroshi Ogushi in the closed caucus election by a margin of 39 to 14. Tamaki was initially to lead the party in the Diet while Koike remained as a national leader. Four days after the leadership election, Koike resigned her leadership post, leaving Tamaki as the sole leader of the party.

Candidates

Running 
Yuichiro Tamaki, member of the House of Representatives for Kagawa 2nd district and former Deputy Secretary-General of the Democratic Party.
Hiroshi Ogushi, member of the House of Representatives for Saga 2nd district and former Parliamentary Secretary for the Cabinet Office.

Declined 
Shu Watanabe, member of the House of Representatives for Shizuoka 6th district and former Vice Defense Minister
Kenta Izumi, member of the House of Representatives for Kyoto 3rd district and former Parliamentary Secretary for the Cabinet Office.

Results

References 

2017 elections in Japan
Political party leadership elections in Japan
November 2017 events in Japan
Kibō no Tō leadership election